This is a list of members of the Tasmanian Legislative Council between 1975 and 1981. Terms of the Legislative Council did not coincide with Legislative Assembly elections, and members served six year terms, with a number of members facing election each year.

Elections

Members

Notes

  On 11 July 1976, Ben McKay, the member for Pembroke, died. His son Peter McKay won the resulting by-election on 2 October 1976.

Sources
 
 Parliament of Tasmania (2006). The Parliament of Tasmania from 1856

Members of Tasmanian parliaments by term
20th-century Australian politicians